Custer High School may refer to:
Custer High School (Custer, Montana)
Custer High School (Custer, South Dakota)
Custer High School (Milwaukee, Wisconsin)